Sir Sydney Frank Markham (19 October 1897 – 13 October 1975) was a British politician who represented three constituencies, each on behalf of a different party, in Parliament.

Born in Stony Stratford, he left school at the age of fourteen. Following service in France, Greece and Mesopotamia during the First World War, he was awarded a commission, and left the Army in 1921. He studied at Wadham College, Oxford and then became an assistant to Sir Sidney Lee with his work on Shakespeare. He later became Secretary, then President, of the Museums Association.

Having fought Guildford for Labour in 1924, he was elected for that party at the 1929 general election as MP for Chatham, and defected with Ramsay MacDonald to become a National Labour MP just before standing down at the 1931 general election. It was under these colours that he was elected for Nottingham South in 1935. He lost this seat standing as a 'National Independent' in the 1945 general election, following the official dissolution of National Labour.

At the 1950 general election, he stood as the Conservative candidate in the Buckingham constituency, but failed to unseat the sitting Labour Member of Parliament, Aidan Crawley.  However, at the 1951 general election, he beat Crawley by a majority of only 54 votes.  He held the seat with narrow majorities at the 1955 election and at the 1959 election and stood down before the 1964 general election.

He was conferred the honour of Knighthood by Queen Elizabeth II on 30 June 1953 in the 1953 Coronation Honours.

He was a Fellow of the Royal Historical Society, the Royal Meteorological Society and the Royal Geographical Society.

In retirement, he was best noted for his A History of Milton Keynes and District (two volumes)  (see History of Milton Keynes).  A secondary school in Milton Keynes, Buckinghamshire - now replaced -  was named after him. He is buried in Calverton Road cemetery, Stony Stratford in Milton Keynes, along with  his wife Frances.

References

UK General Elections since 1832  at Keele University

External links
 Frank Markham's headstone
 
 The Monuments Men: Maj. S. F. Markham
 national archives
 National Portrait Gallery
 Credited books in worldcat.org/identities

  serving alongside John Worthington and Ralph Glyn

1897 births
1975 deaths
Conservative Party (UK) MPs for English constituencies
Knights Bachelor
Labour Party (UK) MPs for English constituencies
History of Milton Keynes
National Labour (UK) politicians
UK MPs 1929–1931
UK MPs 1935–1945
UK MPs 1951–1955
UK MPs 1955–1959
UK MPs 1959–1964
Politicians awarded knighthoods
Parliamentary Private Secretaries to the Prime Minister